Inside Market Data is a weekly newsletter published by Incisive Media providing news for the financial market data industry.

It was launched in 1985 by Waters, later Risk Waters Group, which in 2003 was acquired by Incisive Media.

External links
 insidemarketdata.com
 Incisive Media

1985 establishments in the United Kingdom
Business magazines published in the United Kingdom
Magazines established in 1985
Newsletters
Weekly magazines published in the United Kingdom